is a private junior college in Kōchi, Kōchi Prefecture, Japan, established in 1967.

External links
 Official website 

Japanese junior colleges
Educational institutions established in 1967
Private universities and colleges in Japan
Universities and colleges in Kōchi Prefecture